Mike Marsh (born August 13, 1974 in Miami, Florida) is the drummer for The Avett Brothers and formerly of Dashboard Confessional. Mike was featured on all Dashboard Confessional's albums, from The Places You Have Come To Fear The Most to Alter the Ending. He also played with them for MTV Unplugged.  In 2006, Marsh and Dashboard Confessional did an AOL Sessions recording, playing not only their songs, but a cover of "In A Big Country" by Big Country. According to posts by Mike on Facebook, he officially joined The Avett Brothers as their drummer in early 2013. Mike is also an engineer and record producer. He has a recording studio in East Nashville called Papermill Studio.

Biography 
Marsh started drumming in 9th grade around 13 years of age.  He was  the drummer and one of the lead vocalists for the Miami ska/thrash/punk band, The Agency, which featured guitarist/vocalist Klaus Ketelhohn and bassist/vocalist Chris Drueke. Their second album Engines was released on Fiddler Records and featured Chris Carrabba of Dashboard Confessional.

Marsh had a short stint in the Florida band Seville whose EP Waiting In Seville was also released on Fiddler Records. In February 2002, it was announced that Marsh decided to stay in Dashboard Confessional rather than pursue a career with Seville.

Marsh met The Avett Brothers while in Malibu, California to meet Rick Rubin. On March 28, 2009, Marsh played with The Avett Brothers on The Late Show with David Letterman. In December 2012, Marsh was asked to join the Avett Brothers full time.

Personal life 
Marsh owns an East Nashville studio called The Papermill, where he is both a producer and engineer. He and his ex-wife, Lori, and his two daughters Bette and Rhett, reside in Nashville, Tennessee.

Discography

With The Agency

Studio albums 

 1997: Rock To The Apocalypse 
 2000: Engines
 2007: Turn

With Seville 

 2001: Waiting in Seville

With Dashboard Confessional

Studio albums 

 2000: The Swiss Army Romance
 2001: The Places You Have Come To Fear The Most
 2003: A Mark, a Mission, a Brand, a Scar
 2006: Dusk and Summer
 2007: The Shade of Poison Trees
 2009: Alter the Ending

Live albums 

 2002: MTV Unplugged 2.0

EPs 

 2001: The Drowning EP
 2001: So Impossible EP
 2002: Summers Kiss EP
 2006: Sessions@AOL

With The Avett Brothers

Studio albums 

 2009: I And Love And You
 2016: True Sadness
 2019: Closer Than Together

Live albums 

 2015: Live Vol. Four

References 

1974 births
Living people
American rock drummers
The Avett Brothers members
Dashboard Confessional members
20th-century American drummers
American male drummers
21st-century American drummers
20th-century American male musicians
21st-century American male musicians